Meir Barad (born 7 November 1949) is an Israeli former professional footballer that has played in Hapoel Be'er Sheva, he is of a Tunisian-Jewish descent.

Honours

Club
 Hapoel Be'er Sheva

 Premier League:
 Winners (2): 1974/1975, 1975/1976
 Super Cup:
 Winners (1): 1974/1975
 Runners-up (1): 1975/1976
 Lillian Cup:
 Runners-up (1): 1982
 Second League:
 Winners (1): 1970/1971
 Super Cup Second League:
 Winners (1): 1970/1971

References

1949 births
Living people
Israeli footballers
Hapoel Be'er Sheva F.C. players
Hapoel Haifa F.C. players
Beitar Be'er Sheva F.C. players
Hapoel Jerusalem F.C. players
Hapoel Dimona F.C. players
Israel international footballers
Liga Leumit players
People from Pardes Hanna-Karkur
Footballers from Beersheba
Israeli people of Tunisian-Jewish descent
Association football midfielders
Israeli Football Hall of Fame inductees